Aqua cycling or aqua spinning is a technique in fitness training. In aqua cycling, a stationary apparatus similar to a bicycle frame is submerged in a pool, while its rider's upper body remains above the water.

Private Aqua Cycling 
Private Aqua Cycling is a fitness concept that combines underwater workout with active balneotherapy in private rooms.

See also
 Water aerobics
 Aquajogging

References

Further reading
 "Aqua cycling: A new underwater workout". Fox News. 
 "Spotlight on Aqua Studio: The Country's First Underwater Cycling Destination". Vogue.

Aerobic exercise
Water sports
Cycling